Amadou Samb (born 22 April 1988) is a Senegalese footballer who plays for Gżira United in the Maltese Premier League.

Club career
Samb was signed by professional club Monza in October 2008, after the court of Treviglio upheld the appeal from Monza for the decision of Italian Football Federation (FIGC). FIGC restricted Italian clubs from signing non-EU player, in although it also has some allowance, one of them is, a non-EU senior players who purely a youth product of Italian clubs can also be registered. Before formally signed by Monza, he also played for amateur side Forza e Costanza, which was in Promozione (7th highest level of the pyramid). He also played for Monza in friendly before the bureaucratic clearance.

Samb played 45 games in Lega Pro Prima Divisione (3rd highest level of the pyramid), for Monza in the first two seasons. He also won Berretti youth league as overage player. He missed few months in 2010–11 season due to injury, just played 8 times for Monza (2 in cup).

On 29 January 2011 signed by Serie A club Chievo. He wore no.9 shirt. After the end of the season, he signed the loan contract for U.S. Cremonese, team of Lega Pro Prima Divisione. Before he left the club, he picked no.14 shirt for 2011–12 Serie A.
In the 2012–13 season he signed the loan contract for Lumezzane. On 30 June 2013 Samb was released by Chievo in order to make the team have a non-EU registration quota from abroad.

In January 2014 he was signed by cross-town rival Hellas Verona, who were also in Serie A, but was immediately sent out to Albanian club KF Teuta Durrës for the remainder of the 2013–14 season on loan. He scored on his debut on 2 February against KS Lushnja in a 6–2 victory.

On 30 August 2014 he joined Floriana.

References

External links
 
 

Senegalese footballers
A.C. Monza players
A.C. ChievoVerona players
U.S. Cremonese players
F.C. Lumezzane V.G.Z. A.S.D. players
Floriana F.C. players
Gżira United F.C. players
Serie C players
Maltese Premier League players
Association football forwards
Senegalese expatriate footballers
Senegalese expatriate sportspeople in Italy
Expatriate footballers in Italy
Senegalese expatriate sportspeople in Albania
Expatriate footballers in Albania
Senegalese expatriate sportspeople in Malta
Expatriate footballers in Malta
Sportspeople from Thiès
1988 births
Living people